Dark World (translit. Temny Mir) is a 2010 Russian urban fantasy film directed by Anton Megerdichev. The film was the first Russian 3D format movie.

Plot
A group of students on a field trip to Lapland uncovers an ancient shield. One of the students gets possessed by some sort of spirit essence and when a supposed rescue team arrives an epic battle over an entity trapped in the shield begins.

Cast
 Svetlana Ivanova — Maria
 Ivan Zhidkov — Kostya
 Elena Panova — Helvi
 Sergej Ugryumov — Aleksandr Volkov
 Ilya Alekseyev — Arthur
 Maria Kozhevnikova — Vika
 Vladimir Nosik — Expedition Leader (professor)
 Kseniya Radchenko — Valya
 Aleksandra Valker
 Ira Antikajnen
 Denis Yushechkin

External links
 
 

2010 films
2010s Russian-language films
2010s fantasy thriller films
2010s mystery thriller films
Russian 3D films
Russian fantasy thriller films
Russian mystery thriller films
2010 3D films